Ancient Future is the second album by American heavy metal band Warrior. It was released 13 years after their debut album Fighting for the Earth.

Track listing 
"Fight or Fall" – 04:16
"Pray" – 04:12
"Who Sane?" – 04:20
"Learn to Love" – 04:58
"Tonight We Ride" – 05:18
"Power" – 04:32
"White Mansions" – 04:42
"The Rush" – 05:14
"Tear It Down" – 03:29
"Ancient Future" – 03:44

Personnel 
Parramore McCarty – vocals
Joe Floyd – guitars, bass on tracks 4, 5, 6, 9
Mick Perez – guitars, keyboards
Sam – bass
Dave DuCey – drums
Roy Z – guitars, bass on tracks 1, 2, 3, 8
Eddie Casillas – bass on track 10
Jorge Palacios – additional drums

1998 albums